Natasha Radojčić-Kane (born in Belgrade, Serbia, Yugoslavia) is an American writer of Serbian descent.

She graduated from Columbia University where she earned an MFA in fiction. She is the author of two novels, Homecoming and You Don't Have to Live Here. She has also written several plays and screenplays. She is a co-founder of the literary journal H.O.W. Journal. Radojčić-Kane lives in New York City.

Works
Homecoming (2002)
You Don't Have to Live Here (2005)

References

External links
radojcic.com
Boston Review - Natasha Radojcic-Kane
BalkanMedia - Nataša Radojčić
Danas - ,,Ne moraš da živiš ovde" nakon ,,Povratka kući"
Sajam knjiga - Nataša Radojčić
Laguna - Nataša Radojčić

1966 births
Living people
American women writers
Serbian emigrants to the United States
Writers from Belgrade
Columbia University School of the Arts alumni
21st-century American women